The Herreshoff Goldeneye is an American trailerable sailboat, designed as a day sailer and cruiser and first built in 1959. The hull lines were designed by Nathanael Greene Herreshoff and the rig by A. Sidney DeWolf Herreshoff.

The boat is based on Nathanael Greene Herreshoff's 1914 design, the Bull's Eye and is Herreshoff's design No. 1133.

Production
The design has been built by Cape Cod Shipbuilding in the United States, since 1959, and remains in production.

Design
The Goldeneye is a recreational keelboat, built predominantly of fiberglass, with wood trim. It has a masthead sloop rig; a plumb stem with a bowsprit; a raised counter, angled transom; a keel-mounted rudder controlled by a tiller, a self-bailing cockpit and a fixed long keel. It displaces  and carries  of lead ballast.

It has a small cuddy cabin, with sleeping accommodation for two people and an optional portable head.

The boat is optionally fitted with a small outboard motor for docking and maneuvering. Sails, lifelines, a cradle, a boat trailer and a compass are also all additional-cost options.

For sailing the design may be equipped with a range of jibs, genoas and a symmetrical spinnaker.

See also
List of sailing boat types

References

External links
Official website
Photo of a Herreshoff Goldeneye

Keelboats
1950s sailboat type designs
Sailing yachts
Trailer sailers
Sailboat type designs by Nathanael Greene Herreshoff
Sailboat type designs by A. Sidney DeWolf Herreshoff
Sailboat types built by Cape Cod Shipbuilding